Kas Ahmadan (also Romanized as Kās Aḩmadān; also known as Kāseh Aḩmadān) is a village in Lulaman Rural District, in the Central District of Fuman County, Gilan Province, Iran. At the 2006 census, its population was 297, in 69 families.

References 

Populated places in Fuman County